The GER Class P43 was a class of ten 4-2-2 steam tender locomotives designed by James Holden for the Great Eastern Railway. They were the last 'singles' built for the Great Eastern, and the last in service.

History
Constructed with oil-burning apparatus to speed the elite from the City of London to Cromer, West Runton & Sheringham and capable of reaching North Walsham non-stop in just over two and a half hours. They had  inside cylinders and  driving wheels.

Only a single batch of ten was built, all on order P43 in 1898, numbered 10 to 19. They had a short working life, as they were incapable of handing increasing heavy trains. They were withdrawn between 1907 and 1910.

References

External links

 – Great Eastern Railway Society

P43
4-2-2 locomotives
Railway locomotives introduced in 1898
Scrapped locomotives
Standard gauge steam locomotives of Great Britain
Passenger locomotives